were officials of the Tokugawa shogunate in Edo period Japan.  Those appointmented to this prominent office were exclusively fudai daimyōs. Conventional interpretations have construed these Japanese titles as "commissioner" or "overseer" or "governor".

This bakufu title identifies an official responsible for holding and defending , and for administration of the city of Osaka.  This office was considered only slightly less important than the Kyoto shoshidai; and this important daimyō officer was charged with guarding the security of the Kansai region.  Originally, there were six jodai, but that number was eventually reduced to only one.  Conventionally, the man appointed to this essential position would have previously demonstrated his abilities and loyalty by serving as jisha-bugyō or by having succeeded in another similarly important role.  From this high position, a career path would have typically included promotion to the office of Kyoto shoshidai and then to a position amongst the rōjū in Edo.

Shogunal city
During this period, Osaka ranked with other urban centers, some of which were designated as a "shogunal city".  The number of such cities rose from three to eleven under Tokugawa administration.

List of Osaka jōdai

 Naitō Nobumasa (1619-1626)
 Mizuno Tadakuni (1825)
 Matsudaira Noryasu (1845)
 Matsudaira Tadakata (1845–1848)
 Naitō Nobuchika (1848–1850)
 Matsudaira Nobuatsu (1858–1861)
 Honjō Munehide (1861–1862)

See also
 Bugyō

Notes

References
 Beasley, William G. (1955).  Select Documents on Japanese Foreign Policy, 1853–1868. London: Oxford University Press. [reprinted by RoutledgeCurzon, London, 2001.   (cloth)]
 Brinkley, Frank et al. (1915).  A History of the Japanese People from the Earliest Times to the End of the Meiji Era.  New York: Encyclopædia Britannica.
 Cullen, Louis M. (2003).  A History of Japan, 1582–1941: Internal and External Worlds. Cambridge: Cambridge University Press.  
 Yamamura, Kōzō. (1997).  The Economic Emergence of Modern Japan. Cambridge: Cambridge University Press. 

 
Government of feudal Japan
Osaka Castle